The Kinter K. Koontz House is a historic house and gardens located at 7620 N. 7th Street in Phoenix, Arizona. It was designed in the Spanish Colonial Revival style.

Historic preservation
The property was listed on the National Register of Historic Places on July 20, 2011, as part of a multiple property listing study titled "North Central Phoenix Farmhouses and Rural Estate Homes, 1895–1959, MPS".

It was listed on the City of Phoenix's historic register, and thus given historic preservation overlay zoning by Phoenix in 2003.

References

Houses in Phoenix, Arizona
Houses on the National Register of Historic Places in Arizona
National Register of Historic Places in Phoenix, Arizona
Spanish Colonial Revival architecture in Arizona